Behind the Altar or The Secret of Abbe X is a 1927 German silent drama film directed by Julius Brandt and William Dieterle and starring Dieterle, Marcella Albani, and Alfred Gerasch.

The film's sets were designed by the art directors Erich Grave and Ernst Stern.

Cast

References

Bibliography

External links

1927 films
Films of the Weimar Republic
German silent feature films
Films directed by William Dieterle
Films about Catholic priests
German black-and-white films
German drama films
1927 drama films
Silent drama films
1920s German films
1920s German-language films